Jebel Sahaba (also Site 117) is a prehistoric cemetery site in the Nile Valley (now submerged in Lake Nasser), near the northern border of Sudan with Egypt in Northeast Africa. It is associated with the Qadan culture. Apatite dates indicate that the site is at least 11,600 years old. A 2021 article stated that it dated between 13,400 and 18,600 BP (i.e. 11,450 and 16,650 BC). It was discovered in 1964 by a team led by Fred Wendorf.

The site is often cited as the oldest known evidence of warfare or systemic intergroup violence. Some anthropologists argue that the deaths were linked to environmental pressures.

Discovery 
The original project that discovered the cemetery was the UNESCO High Dam Salvage Project. This salvage dig project was a direct response to the raising of the Aswan Dam which stood to destroy or damage many sites along its path.

Three cemeteries are present in this area. Of these cemeteries, two comprise Jebel Sahaba, with one cemetery located on either side of the Nile. A third cemetery, Tuskha, is situated nearby.

Skeletal remains 
61 individual skeletons were recovered at Jebel Sahaba, as well as numerous other fragmented remains. 38 of the skeletons show signs of trauma, with 16 showing indications of injury at or near time of death. Pointed stone projectiles were found in the bodies of 21 individuals, suggesting that these people had been attacked by spears or arrows. Cut marks were found on the bones of other individuals as well. Some damaged bones had healed, demonstrating a persistent pattern of conflict in this society.

Cranial analysis of the Jebel Sahaba fossils found that they shared osteological affinities with a hominid series from Wadi Halfa in Sudan. Additionally, comparison of the limb proportions of the Jebel Sahaba skeletal remains with those of various ancient and recent series indicated that they were most similar in body shape to the examined modern populations from Sub-Saharan Africa (viz. 19th century fossils belonging to the San population, 19th century West Africa fossils, 19th and 20th century Pygmy fossils, and mid-20th century fossils culled from Kenya and Uganda in East Africa). However, the Jebel Sahaba specimens were post-cranially distinct from the Iberomaurusians and other coeval series from North Africa, and they were also morphologically remote from later Nubian skeletal series and from fossils belonging to the Mesolithic Natufian culture of the Levant.

Curation 
The skeletal remains and any other artifacts recovered by the UNESCO High Dam Salvage Project were donated by Wendorf to the British Museum in 2001; the collection arrived at the museum in March 2002.
This collection includes skeletal and fauna remains, lithics, pottery, and environmental samples as well as the full archive of Wendorf's notes, slides, and other material during the dig.

See also 
 Prehistoric warfare
 Nataruk

References

Further reading

External links

Cemeteries in Sudan
Archaeological sites in Sudan
Paleolithic